Eric Rauchway (born 1969 or 1970) is an American historian and professor at the University of California, Davis. He received his B.A. from Cornell in 1991, and his Ph.D. from Stanford in 1996. Rauchway's scholarship focuses on modern US political, social and economic history, particularly the Progressive Era and the New Deal.

Personal life 
Rauchway is married to historian Kathryn Olmstead, who also teaches at UC Davis.  He was previously married to Meg Arnold, with whom he has two children.

Works 
He is best known for his 2008 book, The Great Depression and the New Deal, and for his associated commentary on Franklin Roosevelt's economic policies, which emphasized the effectiveness of the New Deal as a program of economic recovery and redistribution of political power. The Great Depression and the New Deal was recommended on NPR's All Things Considered as one of three books to read to understand the Great Recession  and featured on C-SPAN Classroom.

Academic books 
 
 The Refuge of Affections: Family and American Reform Politics 1900-1920 (Columbia University Press, 2001) Reviewed in several sources:
 Murdering McKinley: The Making of Theodore Roosevelt's America (Hill and Wang, 2003), It was widely reviewed in both academic and non academic publications .
 Blessed Among Nations: How the World Made America (Hill and Wang, 2006) It had several reviews.
 The Great Depression and the New Deal: A Very Short Introduction (Oxford University Press, 2008)
 The Money Makers: How Roosevelt and Keynes Ended the Depression, Defeated Fascism, and Secured a Prosperous Peace (Basic Books, 2015)
 Winter War: Hoover, Roosevelt, and the First Clash Over the New Deal (Basic Books, 2018)

Other writing 
Rauchway is also the author of a novel, Banana Republican, which continues the story of Tom Buchanan, the primary antagonist in F. Scott Fitzgerald's The Great Gatsby. It was reviewed in The New York Times Book Review Library Journal and Publishers Weekly  and other publications 

He contributes to The Chronicle of Higher Education's group blog Edge of the American West and also the academic blog Crooked Timber. After the January 6, 2021 Capitol Riot, Rauchway along with over 300 other historians signed an open letter calling for a second impeachment of outgoing President Donald Trump. According to Rauchway, "There has even been white supremacist violence relating to elections throughout American history, so I don’t want to say that none of that has happened before. But, I feel this is an important distinction to make for the president himself to incite a white supremacist mob to attack the Capitol with the express purpose of disrupting the election that he lost."

References

External links

 

21st-century American historians
21st-century American male writers
21st-century American non-fiction writers
21st-century American novelists
American male non-fiction writers
Cornell University alumni
Historians of the United States
Living people
Novelists from California
Place of birth missing (living people)
Stanford University alumni
University of California, Davis faculty
Year of birth missing (living people)